Regina Lukk-Toompere (born 23 August 1953) is an Estonian illustrator.

In 1981 she graduated from Estonian State Art Institute's Graphic Art Department in illustration and book design.

She belongs to the following organizations: Estonian Artists' Association, Estonian Graphic Designers' Association, and Estonian Section of IBBY.

She has illustrated over 90 books and textbooks.

References

1953 births
Living people
Estonian women illustrators
Estonian children's book illustrators
20th-century Estonian women artists